West Park can refer to:

Australia
 West Park Oval, an Australian rules football ground in Burnie, Tasmania

China
 West Park, Beijing (Chinese: , Xīyuàn), a former imperial garden beside Taiye Lake west of the Forbidden City
 Various other places in China named Xiyuan, when translated

England
 West Park, Hartlepool, County Durham
 West Park, Darlington, County Durham
 West Park, Goole, a park in Goole, East Riding of Yorkshire
 West Park, Leeds, West Yorkshire
 West Park, Wolverhampton, West Midlands
 West Park, Plymouth, Devon
 West Park, Long Eaton, Derbyshire
 West Park School, Derby, Derbyshire
 West Park, house built in grounds of  West Hall, Kew, Richmond, London

United States
 West Park, California, community in Fresno County
 West Park, Cleveland, neighborhood in Cleveland, Ohio
 West Park, Florida, city
 West Park, New Jersey, census-designated place
 West Park, New York, town
 West Park, Pittsburgh, Pennsylvania, municipal park
 West Park, Stowe Township, neighborhood in Allegheny County, Pennsylvania

See also
 Park West (disambiguation) 
 Western Park (disambiguation)
 Westpark (disambiguation)